Mount Kisco is a village and town in Westchester County, New York, United States. The town of Mount Kisco is coterminous with the village. The population was 10,959 at the 2020 United States census  over 10,877 at the 2010 census.

It serves as a significant historic site along the Washington-Rochambeau Revolutionary Route.

History 
The name Kisco may be connected to the Munsee word asiiskuw ("mud"), and the name of the settlement "first appeared in colonial records as Cisqua, the name of a meadow and river mentioned in the September 6, 1700 Indian deed to land in the area." The spelling Mount Kisko was used by the local postmaster when a post office was opened in the village sometime after 1850. The current spelling of the name was adopted in 1875, with the settlement's incorporation as a village. The town shares its name with the Kisco River, which traverses the town and goes into the Croton Reservoir.

As a village, Mount Kisco originally was half in the town of Bedford and half in the town of New Castle. Mount Kisco became a town in its own right in 1978.

The Mount Kisco Municipal Complex was added to the National Register of Historic Places in 1997. Merestead, St. Mark's Episcopal Church, St. Mark's Cemetery, and the United Methodist Church and Parsonage are also listed.

Geography and climate
According to the United States Census Bureau, the village has a total area of 3.1 square miles (8.1 km2), all  land.

Mount Kisco lies within the humid continental climate zone, experiencing four distinct seasons. Winter is cold, summer is warm and humid, and spring and fall are chilly to mild.

<div style="width:75%">
</div style>

Demographics

As of the 2013 United States Census there were 11,067 people, 4,128 households, and 2,447 families residing in the village. The population density was 3,194.0 people per square mile (1,231.5/km2). There were 4,103 housing units at an average density of 1,312.7 per square mile (506.1/km2). The large number of small businesses, retail stores, and financial and medical offices swells the daytime population to more than 20,000. The racial makeup of the village was 77.79% White, 5.99% African American, 0.28% Native American, 4.24% Asian, 9.03% from other races, and 2.67% from two or more races. Of the population 24.54% were Hispanic or Latino of any race.

There were 3,993 households, out of which 30.2% had children under the age of 18 living with them, 45.3% were married couples living together, 11.6% had a female householder with no husband present, and 38.7% were non-families. Of all households 31.7% were made up of individuals, and 10.0% had someone living alone who was 65 years of age or older. The average household size was 2.49 and the average family size was 3.09.

In the village, the population was spread out, with 22.1% under the age of 18, 7.3% from 18 to 24, 37.0% from 25 to 44, 21.6% from 45 to 64, and 11.9% who were 65 years of age or older. The median age was 36 years. For every 100 females, there were 98.8 males. For every 100 females age 18 and over, there were 94.7 males.

The median income for a household in the village was $62,699, and the median income for a family was $68,219. Males had a median income of $45,428 versus $40,040 for females. The per capita income for the village was $32,424.  About 7.4% of families and 10.5% of the population were below the poverty line, including 11.0% of those under age 18 and 13.8% of those age 65 or over.

Mount Kisco is socioeconomically diverse. Though most residents are middle to upper middle class professionals, Mount Kisco is home to a sizable number of working class Hispanic immigrants who primarily reside in the downtown core. In contrast, sprawling estates and equestrian farms are to be found farther away from the center of town. Worth millions of dollars, these properties are occasionally of a historic nature, many dating back to the late 19th and early 20th centuries. These bucolic country roads, meadows, and rolling hills are often technically within neighboring Bedford, though they share Mount Kisco's ZIP Code and post office. Residents in this overlapping zone may use either a Bedford Corners or Mount Kisco mailing address.

Housing in Mount Kisco is tremendously varied, consisting of apartment buildings, co-ops, condominiums, townhomes, single-family homes, historic Colonials and Victorians, and multimillion-dollar estates.

Infrastructure

Transportation
There are several modes of transport in Mount Kisco.
 Metro-North Railroad: Mount Kisco, on the Harlem Line
 Bee-Line Bus System: Multiple routes
 The Westchester County Airport is nearby.
 New York State's Route 172, 117, 133
 The Saw Mill River Parkway and I-684 are nearby.

Notable people

 Janet Adelman, Shakespearean scholar
 Harold Baker, Senior United States federal judge on the United States District Court for the Central District of Illinois
 Samuel Barber, composer
 Ann Blyth, actress
 Laura Branigan, singer
 Rick Carey, three-time Olympic gold medal winner, and former world record-holder in three events.
 Bennett Cerf, publisher, television personality
 Andrew Daly, actor, comedian
 Norman Dello Joio (born 1956), Olympic medalist equestrian
 Susan Dey, actress 
 Michael Eisner, former CEO of The Walt Disney Company
 Lynn Emanuel, poet
 Arlene Francis, television and radio personality, actress
 Martin Gabel, actor, director, producer
 Lew Gallo, actor, producer
 Alexander Gode, linguist and translator
 Adam Green, musician
 Lillian Greneker, mannequin designer, inventor
 Kimiko Hahn, poet
 Caitlyn Jenner, television personality, author, athlete
 Gavin Macleod, Actor best known for The Mary Tyler Moore Show and The Love Boat  
 Darin Mastroianni, MLB player for the Minnesota Twins
 John Jay McKelvey, Sr., attorney, founder of the Harvard Law Review
 Gian Carlo Menotti, composer, festival founder, life partner of Samuel Barber
 Eugene Meyer, financier, publisher of The Washington Post
 Agnes E. Meyer, journalist, philanthropist, civil rights activist, wife of Eugene Meyer
 Theodore Mook, musician 
 William F. B. O'Reilly, political consultant 
 Doane Perry, musician
 Eric Schmertz, lawyer
 John Schneider, actor, co-founder of Children's Miracle Network
 Alex Shoumatoff, writer
 Bert Sugar, boxing writer, sports historian
 Arthur Ochs Sulzberger, Jr., publisher of The New York Times
 Rob Thomas, musician
 Chaim Michael Dov Weissmandl, rabbi
 Dar Williams, musician

References

External links

 Town of Mount Kisco official website
 Mount Kisco Chamber of Commerce

 
Villages in New York (state)
Towns in Westchester County, New York
Towns in the New York metropolitan area
1875 establishments in New York (state)
Populated places established in 1875